Hydroxyestrone may refer to:

 2-Hydroxyestrone
 4-Hydroxyestrone
 16α-Hydroxyestrone
 16β-Hydroxyestrone